Power Henry Le Poer Trench (11 May 1841 – 30 April 1899) was a British diplomat.

Trench was the son of William Thomas Le Poer Trench, 3rd Earl of Clancarty and Lady Sarah Juliana Butler.

Career
Trench was Secretary of the British Embassy in Berlin between 1888 and 1893.

In Mexico, he was the Envoy Extraordinary and Minister Plenipotentiary  between 1893 and 1894.

He was the British Minister in Tokyo in 1894-1895.

See also
List of Ambassadors from the United Kingdom to Japan
Anglo-Japanese relations

Notes

References
 Ian Nish. (2004). British Envoys in Japan 1859-1972. Folkestone, Kent: Global Oriental. ;  OCLC 249167170

External links
 
 UK in Japan,  Chronology of Heads of Mission

1841 births
1899 deaths
Ambassadors of the United Kingdom to Japan
Younger sons of earls
Ambassadors of the United Kingdom to Mexico
Power
Place of birth missing